Roberto Andrés Ovelar Maldonado (born 1 December 1985) is a Paraguayan footballer who currently plays as a striker for paraguayan club General Caballero Sport Club.

He began his football career at amateur club Karende, and was later scouted by Rogelio Rojas to play for Cerro Porteño, one of the most successful Paraguayan teams. His coach at the moment, Gustavo Costas, called him up for the 2006 season, when the team earned the Primera División. After the 2007 season, Ovelar was loaned to Peruvian side Universidad San Martín de Porres.

In June 2008, he returned to Cerro Porteño after a successful season in Peru, winning the Torneo Descentralizado. In January 2009, Ovelar joined Mexican side Cruz Azul. In June, he returned to Peru and joined Alianza Lima on loan, finalizing his transfer later that season. After several successful seasons at Alianza, he was sent to Chilean Primera División club Universidad Católica in December 2011, for a US$1.5 million fee.

Ovelar represented the Paraguayan national under-20 football team in 2001, aged 16, playing in five games but unable to score at the South American Youth Championship.

Club career

Early career
Roberto Ovelar began his career with Paraguayan side Cerro Porteño, where he was able to play regularly and score 10 goals in the 2006-2007 season. In 2007, Ovelar signed on loan with Peru side San Martín de Porres at the age of 22. Ovelar made significant achievements during the 2007 Apertura and the 2008 Clausura of the Torneo Descentralizado.

Cruz Azul
Ovelar signed for Mexican side Cruz Azul for the Clausura 2009 tournament after his time in San Martín de Porres. While in Mexico, Ovelar saw it as an opportunity to one day play for the Paraguay national football team, as the league featured Paraguayan players who were on the national squad. His limited play in 5 matches enabled him to score 1 goal despite being unable to get a starting position.

Alianza Lima   
After barely playing in Cruz Azul, Ovelar returned to Peru, going to Alianza Lima. He had excellent performances which gave him the opportunity to play for the Peru national team, but he was keen to play for Paraguay. His first goal came on December 5, 2009, in a 2-2 home draw against Cesar Vallejo. His 45th minute go-ahead goal made up for an own-goal he had scored in the 30th minute. Ovelar was subbed off in the 75th minute, replaced by a young André Carrillo.

Universidad Católica
For summer 2012, Ovelar signed with Chilean side Universidad Católica. He played 15 matches and scored 5 goals. His debut came on January 28, 2012, in a 2-1 win at Palestino. He was subbed off in the 67th minute and replaced by Francisco Pizarro. His first league goal came on March 11, 2012, in a 2-1 win at O'Higgins. He scored a last minute goal to give his team the win.

Atlético Junior
In 2014, Ovelar signed for Colombian side Junior. He made his debut on July 20, 2014 (on Colombian Independence Day), in a 0–1 defeat against AS Monaco for the 2014 Copa EuroAmericana.

He is second on the all time list of appearances for the team, with over 140 caps in all competitions.

Millonarios
In January 2018, Ovelar moved to Millonarios in the Categoría Primera A for an undisclosed transfer fee. He made his team debut and start on February 11, 2018 in a 1-0 victory over Patriotas Boyacá.

References

External links
 
 
 Roberto Ovelar at Football-Lineups
 Official web site

1985 births
Living people
Paraguayan footballers
Paraguay under-20 international footballers
Paraguayan expatriate footballers
Cerro Porteño players
Club Libertad footballers
Club Deportivo Universidad de San Martín de Porres players
Club Alianza Lima footballers
Cruz Azul footballers
Club Deportivo Universidad Católica footballers
Juan Aurich footballers
Atlético Junior footballers
Club Olimpia footballers
Once Caldas footballers
Paraguayan Primera División players
Peruvian Primera División players
Chilean Primera División players
Liga MX players
Categoría Primera A players
Paraguayan expatriate sportspeople in Chile
Paraguayan expatriate sportspeople in Mexico
Paraguayan expatriate sportspeople in Peru
Paraguayan expatriate sportspeople in Colombia
Expatriate footballers in Chile
Expatriate footballers in Mexico
Expatriate footballers in Peru
Expatriate footballers in Colombia
Association football forwards